Orathanad (or Mukthambalpuram; sometimes Orathanadu) is a town in Thanjavur district of the Indian state of Tamil Nadu. It is recognised as a Town Panchayat. It is located at a distance of 33 km from Thanjavur and 35 km from Pattukkottai. The town is surrounded by vast agricultural lands.

Geography and climate 
On 27 November 2008  Orathanadu broke the 65-year-old record for the highest rainfall in 24 hours in Tamil Nadu, registering  and exceeding the  registered by Cuddalore on 18 May 1943. However, Orathanadu lost the rainfall record to Kethi in the Nilgiris district after the town recorded  of rain in 24 hours during early November 2009.
.

Demographics 

 census, Orathanad had a population of 10,247. The total population constitute, 4,887 males and 5,360 females —a sex ratio of 1097 females per 1000 males. 1,078 children are in the age group of 0–6 years, of which 511 are boys and 567 are girls. The average literacy rate stands at 76.54% with 7,018 literates.

 India census, Orathanadu (Mukthambalchathram) had a population of 10,268. Males constituted 49% of the population and females 51%. Orathanadu (Mukthambalchathram) had an average literacy rate of 75%, higher than the national average of 59.5%: male literacy was 81%, and female literacy was 68%. 10% of the population was under 6 years of age.

Education 
Orathanad has two major educational institutions. One is Tamil Nadu Veterinary College And Research Institute and the another one is Government college of education.

References

Cities and towns in Thanjavur district